Ivato or Ivato Centre is a town and commune in Madagascar. It belongs to the district of Ambositra, which is a part of Amoron'i Mania Region.

Geography
This town lies at the intersection of the Route nationale 35 to Morondava and the Route nationale 7 from Antananarivo to Fianarantsoa. It is approximately 15 km South of Ambositra.

Population 
The population of the commune was 22,745 in 2018. Primary and junior level secondary education are available in town. The majority 75% of the population of the commune are farmers, while an additional 15% receives their livelihood from raising livestock. Services provide employment for the other 10% of the population.

Crops 
The most important crop is rice, while other important products are peanuts, beans, cassava and tomato.

References

Populated places in Amoron'i Mania